Clarke v Dickson (1858) EB & E 148 is an English contract law case concerning misrepresentation. It stands as an example of the restrictive approach common law courts took to rescission for misrepresentation before the leading case of Erlanger v New Sombrero Phosphate Co held only substantial counter restitution was needed.

Facts
Mr Clarke said he was induced by the three defendants’ statements to take shares in The Welsh Potosi Lead and Copper Mining Company, formed for working on a mine on the cost-book principle. Dividends were declared in 1854-6. Then Mr Clarke accepted fresh allotments in lieu of dividends. In 1857 the company's performance was poor and it was liquidated under the Winding-up Act 1855. Then Mr Clarke discovered that the representations about its cost-book practices were false and fraudulent. He sued to recover deposits for the shares.

Judgment
Crompton J held that the contract could not be rescinded, since the shares were now worthless. He said where someone wants to exercise the voidable option,

Erle J and Lord Campbell CJ concurred.

See also
English contract law
Misrepresentation in English law
UK company law

Notes

English misrepresentation case law
1858 in case law
1858 in British law
United Kingdom company case law